Compagnie de Transports au Maroc (or CTM) is a transport company in Morocco. It was established in November 1919 and is thus the oldest Moroccan public transport company.

History
The idea for CTM originated during Sultan Abd al-Hafid's visit France in August 1912, with General Hubert Lyautey personally supervising the trip. The Moroccan sultan spent time in the resort town of Vichy, where Jean Epinat owned a number or transport companies.

On November 8, 1919, Sultan Abd al-Hafid passed a dhahir sanctioning the establishment of the transportation company.

La Compagnie de Transports au Maroc was founded November 30, 1919 with the goal of accessing "all of Morocco." Its services ran along a new colonial road system planned with the aim of linking all major towns and cities.

At the beginning, the vehicles used by CTM were repurposed World War I military vehicles. Second class passengers rode on the roofs of these vehicles.

As a collaborator with the French colonial regime, Thami El Glaoui was a major shareholder in CTM.

The company began as a private company before being sold to the Moroccan government after independence in 1956. In 1993, under the campaign of privatisation in Morocco, the company was floated on the Casablanca Stock Exchange

Corporate information
The company's president is Ezzoubaïr Errhaimini. In 2009, CTM's revenue totaled 406 million dirhams.

CTM's European partners include Eurolines Belgium (Epervier), Eurolines France S.A, Deutsch Touring, SITA, Sadem, Lazzi (Eurolines Italy), CLP, Julia (Eurolines Spain), Linebus and Alsa.  Currently CTM serves over 100 domestic destinations and more than 80 international destinations in Spain, France, Belgium, Italy, Germany and the Netherlands.

References

External links
 Compagnie de Transports au Maroc —CTM website

Transport companies of Morocco
Public transport operators
Companies based in Casablanca
Transport companies established in 1919
1919 establishments in Morocco